The Dodge Series D8 appeared in October 1937 for the 1938 model year, replacing the previous year's Series D5. Production of the 1938 Dodges ran from September 1937 until July 1938, which was the typical pattern for Dodge in this period. As before, there was also a "Junior" line of Plymouths using Dodge badges and trim for the Canadian and global export markets. The main version is sometimes referred to as the "Senior" Dodge to distinguish the two.

Series D8
The D8 was largely a facelifted D5 and continued to use the same  flathead straight-six engine developing  at 3600 rpm, single-disc dry-plate clutch, and three-speed manual transmission. A vacuum-operated semi-automatic system was an available option. The grille was shaped more like a shield and had slimmer chrome strips down the center, the headlamps were moved from being mounted on the sides of the grille onto the fender aprons, while the hood louvers were of a new, less busy design. The Dodge Bros. emblem with its six-sided star made its last appearance on a Dodge car, along with a leaping ram hood ornament. While it was not immediately clear from the outside, the body was now all-steel with much better insulation than before. The front seatbacks were adjustable.

Most D8's sat on the shorter  wheelbase; only the seven-seater Touring Sedan, the five-seater Limousine with a division window, and the naked chassis used the longer  version. The Limousine with a division window received leather upholstery in the front compartment, velvet mohair in the rear. The standard bodyworks were two- and four-door sedans, available as "Fastbacks" or "Touring" designs, with the Touring versions receiving an enclosed luggage compartment. There were two 2-door coupes, the two-seater "Business Coupe" and the "Rumble-Seat Coupe," which had two inside seats and two more in the rumble seat. Convertible versions included the 2-door "Convertible Coupe" and the 4-door "Convertible Sedan." New for 1938 was the semi-custom "Westchester Suburban" four-door woodie station wagon, of which 375 were built. Dodge woodies had been made before, but only by outside coachbuilders.

To meet Australian import restrictions, Chrysler shipped bare chassis with a cowl which were then fitted with locally made bodies. T.J. Richards & Sons Ltd. of Adelaide built all-steel bodies in a select few bodystyles, including a GM-inspired two-door, five-seater Coupe with a rakish rear called a "Sloper."

In October 1938, the D8 was replaced by the Series D11, while the Junior line models (for export and the Canadian market) were badged D12 and D13 for 1939. 114,529 Dodge D8s were built in the calendar year. 1938 was a recession year; Dodge sales dropped 59 percent for the calendar year which dropped them to fifth in sales, down from fourth the year before.

Dodge Juniors
The so-called Junior line used the Plymouth's chassis, body, and engine, with the grille and other trim parts from Dodge's Senior line. The basic business version (D9) was built in Canada as well as in Detroit, while the deluxe D10 was only built in Canada. The American-made D9s were made for overseas markets only and were also available in right-hand drive. Their equipment and bodystyles correspond to Plymouths's P5 and P6 models from the same year, sitting on the same  wheelbase. Both series were available as a two-door Business Coupe, and as two- or four-door standard or Touring Sedans. The D10 was also available as a Rumble-Seat Coupe.

D9s as well as D10s received Plymouth's smaller  version of Chrysler's flathead engine, producing  at 3600 rpm. 81 of the Detroit-built D9s received a narrow-bore export engine displacing  to suit local tax designations, developing 19.8 RAC horsepower rather than the larger engine's 23.4 hp. During 1938, Chrysler Canada opened an engine casting plant at Windsor, just south of the main plant.

Just over 7,500 D9s were built in Detroit (with 4,285 being right-hand drive), while 10,695 D9 and D10 were built in Canada. Of the Canadian-built cars, over three quarters were of the Deluxe model.

References

External links 

D8
Full-size vehicles
Cars introduced in 1937